6 ships of the Imperial Russian and Soviet Navies have been named Petropavlovsk after the 1854 Siege of Petropavlovsk.

  - Steam frigate converted to an armored frigate while under construction
  -  pre-dreadnought battleship sunk during the Russo-Japanese War of 1904–1905
  -  that participated in World War I and World War II before being scrapped in 1953
  -  formerly named Lützow
  -  formerly named Kaganovich
  -  commissioned in 1973 and scrapped in 1996

Russian Navy ship names